George Hopkins Bond (August 10, 1873 – May 8, 1954) was an American football player, coach, and lawyer.  He served as the head football coach at Syracuse University for one season in 1894, compiling a record of 6–5. Bond was born in Syracuse, New York on August 10, 1873.  He graduated from Syracuse University with a bachelor's degree in philosophy in 1894 and from Syracuse University College of Law in 1897.  Bond was a senior partner in the law firm of Bond, Schoeneck & King until his resignation in 1953.  In 1937 he served as president of the New York State Bar Association.  He was also an organizer and president of the New York State Association of District Attorneys.

Head coaching record

References

External links
 

1873 births
1954 deaths
19th-century players of American football
Syracuse Orange football coaches
Syracuse Orange football players
New York (state) lawyers
Onondaga County District Attorneys
Syracuse University College of Law alumni
Coaches of American football from New York (state)
Players of American football from Syracuse, New York